Ann Casson (6 November 1915 – 2 May 1990) was an English stage and film actress. She was a daughter of acting couple Sir Lewis Casson and Dame Sybil Thorndike and had three siblings: John, Christopher and Mary. She was married to actor Douglas Campbell and had four children.

Selected filmography
 Escape (1930)
 The Shadow Between (1931)
 Number Seventeen (1932)
 Dance Pretty Lady (1932)
 Bachelor's Baby (1932)
 The Marriage Bond (1932)
 George and Margaret (1940)
 I Bought a Vampire Motorcycle (1990)

References

Bibliography

 Gale, Maggie. West End Women: Women and the London Stage 1918 - 1962. Routledge, 2012, .
 Yacowar, Maurice & Grant, Barry Keith. Hitchcock's British Films. Wayne State University Press, 2010, .

External links

1915 births
1990 deaths
English film actresses
English stage actresses
Actresses from London
20th-century English actresses